The San Diego County–Imperial County Regional Communications System, known locally as the RCS, provides wireless 800 MHz voice (radio) and data communications—on separate networks—to over 200 local, county, state, and federal public safety and public service agencies in San Diego County, California and Imperial County, California. The day-to-day operations are managed by the Wireless Services Division of the San Diego County Sheriff's Department.

The RCS voice network is a Project 25 Phase II 800 MHz trunked, simulcast system. It currently is mixed Phase I and Phase II digital communications and digital encryption capable. In the near future it will be full Phase II TDMA modulation. 

The RCS data network is provided to the County of San Diego Sheriffs Department only, and uses the Motorola 700 MHz conventional High Performance Data system. It provide wireless data access to computerized applications, such as computer aided dispatch (CAD), automated law enforcement databases, and unit messaging.

History

Timeline of notable events
December 8, 1992 - San Diego County Board of Supervisors approved the RCS business plan
March 7, 1995 - Governing bodies signed the Participating Agency Agreement
March 5, 1996 - San Diego County Board authorized contract with Motorola & financing of remaining RCS components
December 1996 - Construction of 43 radio repeater sites began
May 1998 - Participating agencies began using the RCS
December 1999 - San Diego County portion of the project completed
March 5, 2001 - Santana High School shooting
March 22, 2001 - Granite Hills High School shooting
October 25, 2003 - Cedar Fire and Paradise Fire
June, 2017 - FCC mandated 800MHz re-banding begins on the RCS, with the Northeast Cell being the first.

Member agencies

Counties
San Diego
Imperial

Cities

San Diego County
Carlsbad
Chula Vista
Coronado
Del Mar
El Cajon
Encinitas
Escondido
Imperial Beach
La Mesa
Lemon Grove
National City
Port of San Diego
Poway
Oceanside
San Marcos
Santee
Solana Beach
Vista

Imperial County
Brawley
Calexico
Calipatria
El Centro
Holtville
Imperial
Westmorland

See also
Motorola Trunked Radio
Trunked radio system

References
San Diego County-Imperial County Regional Communications System Overview
Radio Reference

External links
San Diego County-Imperial County Regional Communications System
San Diego County Sheriff's Department
San Diego County Sheriff's Department Wireless Services Division
San Diego County Sheriff's Department Communications Center

Government of Imperial County, California
Government of San Diego County, California
Trunked radio systems